The Ferrari GTC4Lusso (Type F151M) is a four-seat grand tourer produced by Italian automobile manufacturer Ferrari. The GTC4Lusso is a successor to the Ferrari FF.

Models

GTC4Lusso (2016–2020)
Like its predecessor, the GTC4Lusso is a 3-door shooting brake with an all-wheel drive drivetrain, and is powered by a front-mid mounted V12 engine.

The increase in output of the engine is due to the compression ratio raised to 13.5:1.

The car uses an improved version (called the 4RM Evo) of Ferrari's patented four-wheel drive system introduced on the FF, integrated with four-wheel steering into the system. Collectively, the system is called 4RM-S.

The GTC4Lusso was unveiled at the 2016 Geneva Motor Show.

GTC4Lusso T (2017–2020)
Unveiled at the 2016 Paris Motor Show, the GTC4Lusso T is a rear wheel drive only version of the GTC4Lusso powered by a V8 engine with lesser displacement, though the 4WS four-wheel steering system from its V12 variant is retained.

On August 31, 2020, Ferrari confirmed the end of production for the GTC4Lusso. No replacement has been announced.

Design 

The rear features Ferrari's signature Quad Circular Rear Lights (last seen on the F430 and later seen on the 812 Superfast) and the interior contains a Dual Cockpit Concept Design, separating the Driver Cockpit and the Passenger Cockpit by a central divider. The front of the car has a single grille that provides all the necessary cooling. 

The GTC4Lusso is a further refinement of the shooting-brake coupe, reinterpreting the concept with an extremely streamlined, tapered shape that gives it an almost fastback-like silhouette.

Engines

One-offs

Ferrari BR20  

The Ferrari BR20 is a one-off model created by Ferrari's Special Projects Programme and based on the V12-engined GTC4Lusso. It features redesigned bodywork that Ferrari says takes inspiration from past V12 Ferrari models such as the 410 Superamerica and 500 Superfast, with the biggest change being a new rear roofline that turns the car from a shooting brake into a fastback coupé. The new bodywork also features changes to the front bumper, rear bumper, exhaust tips, rear diffuser, and headlights, as well as new carbon fiber and chrome trim on the front and sides respectively. The new bodywork increases the overall length by three inches over the standard GTC4Lusso, and the rear seats were removed to accommodate the new sloping roofline. The interior features upholstery in two shades of brown leather, with carbon fiber and oak trim. Mechanically the car reportedly remains unchanged from the standard V12 GTC4Lusso. The price of this car has been not revealed and was developed for a long-standing customer. It currently resides in Saudi Arabia.

References

External links 

 
  (GTC4Lusso T)

All-wheel-drive vehicles
Cars introduced in 2016
Coupés
GTC4Lusso
Grand tourers
Station wagons
Vehicles with four-wheel steering